Ideluy-e Sofla (also Romanized as Īdelūy-e Soflá; also known as Īdehlū-ye Pā'īn) is a village in Churs Rural District, in the Central District of Chaypareh County, West Azerbaijan Province, Iran. At the 2006 census, its population was 37, in 5 families.

References 

Populated places in Chaypareh County